Soorya Thottangal (born ) was an Indian female volleyball player. She was part of the India women's national volleyball team.

She participated at the 2010 Asian Games.
On club level she played for Kerala in 2010.

References

External links
http://mussenstellen.com/article/indien-bei-den-asian-games-2010

1989 births
Living people
21st-century Indian women
21st-century Indian people
Place of birth missing (living people)
Indian women's volleyball players
Volleyball players from Kerala
Sportswomen from Kerala
Volleyball players at the 2010 Asian Games
Asian Games competitors for India